Apostolos Nanos (born February 5, 1966) is an archer from Greece. He competed at the 2004 Summer Olympics in men's individual archery.

He was defeated in the first round of elimination, placing 57th overall.

Nanos was also a member of the 13th-place Greek men's archery team at the 2004 Summer Olympics.

References

1966 births
Living people
Greek male archers
Archers at the 2004 Summer Olympics
Olympic archers of Greece
Communist Party of Greece politicians
Greek MPs 2012 (May)
People from Volos